El Deportivo Coatepeque, is a Guatemalan football club based in Coatepeque, Quetzaltenango Department.

They play their home games at Israel Barrios Stadium.

History
Deportivo Coatepeque plays in the Liga Nacional (the Narional Major League of Guatemalan Football)

Deportivo Coatepeque was founded in 1967, under the name of Deportivo Independencia which was later changed to Deportivo Coatepeque.

The team won promotion to the premier Liga Nacional for the first time in their history and is playing in this top Guatemalan Major National League during the 2013–14 season.

Current squad

Historical list of coaches

 Carlos Barone  (2006) (2008) Subcampeon Nacional
 Paulo César de Jesus Barros (2009–10)
 Antonio Archila (2010–11)
 Ramon "El Tanque" Ramírez (2011–12)
 Byron Pérez (2012)
 Gabriel Chato Castillo (2012–13)
 Jeff "Ziggy" Korytoski (2013–14)
 Ulises Sosa (2014)
 Rudy Méndez (2014)
 Manuel Castañeda (Oct 2014 – Feb 2015)
 Héctor Julián Trujillo (Feb 2015–)

Honours

Domestic Competitions

League
Primera División de Ascenso
Winners: Apertura 2022

References

External links

Football clubs in Guatemala
Quetzaltenango Department
1967 establishments in Guatemala